Lahcen Samsam Akka (born 14 June 1942) is a Moroccan athlete. He competed in the men's shot put at the 1964 Summer Olympics and the 1972 Summer Olympics.

References

External links

1942 births
Living people
Athletes (track and field) at the 1964 Summer Olympics
Athletes (track and field) at the 1972 Summer Olympics
Moroccan male shot putters
Olympic athletes of Morocco
Place of birth missing (living people)
Mediterranean Games silver medalists for Morocco
Mediterranean Games medalists in athletics
Athletes (track and field) at the 1971 Mediterranean Games